Kim Un-chol (born September 23, 1979) is a North Korean boxer who competed in the light flyweight (– 48 kg) division at the 2000 Summer Olympics and won the bronze medal.

Olympic results 
 Defeated Sebusiso Keketsi (Lesotho) RSC 4
 Defeated Pál Lakatos (Hungary) 20-8
 Defeated Ivanas Stapovičius (Lithuania) 22-10
 Lost to Rafael Lozano (Spain) 10-15

References
 

1979 births
Living people
Boxers at the 2000 Summer Olympics
Olympic bronze medalists for North Korea
Olympic boxers of North Korea
Olympic medalists in boxing
Medalists at the 2000 Summer Olympics
Boxers at the 2002 Asian Games
North Korean male boxers
Asian Games competitors for North Korea
Light-flyweight boxers